The 1856 United States presidential election in New Jersey took place on November 4, 1856, as part of the 1856 United States presidential election. Voters chose seven representatives, or electors to the Electoral College, who voted for president and vice president.

New Jersey voted for the Democratic candidate, James Buchanan, over Republican candidate, John C. Frémont, and the Know Nothing candidate, Millard Fillmore. Buchanan won the state by a margin of 18.72 percentage points, and would be the last Democratic presidential candidate to carry Cumberland County until Franklin D. Roosevelt in 1936, and the last to carry Passaic County until Roosevelt in 1932.

Results

See also
 United States presidential elections in New Jersey

References

New Jersey
1856
1856 New Jersey elections